The Alexander Smith House in Madison, Wisconsin was built in 1848 in Greek Revival style.

A historic marker at the house indicates it is Greek Revival in design, and that it served as a halfway house serving travelers between Milwaukee and Prairie de Chien.

References

Houses in Madison, Wisconsin